Oculogryphus bicolor, is a species of firefly beetles belonging to the family Lampyridae. It is endemic to Vietnam.

Body length of male is 6.2–8.2 mm. Body elongate oval and depressed. Vivid light brown-tan body. Elytra brown. slightly broader elytral epipleura.

References

External links

Beetles described in 2011
Lampyridae
Taxa named by Michael S. Engel